Yan Chai Hospital Tung Chi Ying Memorial Secondary School (YCHTCY) is a government secondary school located at 210 Ma On Shan Road in Ma On Shan, Sha Tin, Hong Kong.

 Pan Yee Lin is the principal.

History
The school was established in 1994.

In 2019, three bullying incidents occurred within the span of a week at YCHTCY; however, further investigation  showed it was some football boys playing around and the incident reported by a disgruntled teacher.  The school has a stream of boys who are sponsored by the Kitchee Football Club, a professional Sports Club in Hong Kong(https://en.wikipedia.org/wiki/Kitchee_SC).  The students attend regular school in the morning then football training in the afternoon.

References

External links

 Yan Chai Hospital Tung Chi Ying Memorial Secondary School 
 

Secondary schools in Hong Kong
Schools in the New Territories
Sha Tin
1994 establishments in Hong Kong